The Pound Puppies is an animated television special, produced by Hanna-Barbera Productions, based on the popular toy line from Tonka, which aired in syndication on October 26, 1985, paired with Star Fairies. The story is a spoof of the 1963 film The Great Escape.

Characters in the special included the Fonzie-styled leader Cooler (voiced by Dan Gilvezan), the cheerleader Bright Eyes (voiced by Adrienne Alexander), and a dog with a very nasal like New York accent known only as "The Nose" (voiced by Joanne Worley), and the goofy inventor aptly named Howler (voiced by Frank Welker), who can only howl.

Plot 
A female dog from a wealthy aristocratic family named Violet Vanderfeller is being pursued by dognappers when she is picked up and taken to the city pound. There, she meets the gang and discovers their mission to find homes for themselves. The film plot centers on Violet (whom Cooler insists on referring to as "Sam") attempting to reunite with her family, ultimately succeeding. Two other dogs appeared in the special. They were the upper-class snob Barkerville and the garbage-can-digging Scrounger.

Voice cast 

 Charles Adler – Flack
 Adrienne Alexander – Bright Eyes
 Ed Begley, Jr. – Arnold
 Sorrell Booke – The Mayor
 Vicky Carroll – The Doc
 Laura Duff - Additional Voice
 June Foray – Mother Superior
 Henry Gibson – Nabbit
 Dan Gilvezan – Cooler
 Gail Matthius – Violet
 Don Messick – Louie, Itchy
 Garrett Morris – The Chief
 Alan Oppenheimer – Barker
 Ron Palillo – Scrounger
 Avery Schreiber – Tubbs
 Frank Welker – Howler, Catgut, Snichey
 Jonathan Winters – Bigelow
 Joanne Worley – Nose

Home media
The special was released on VHS in 1986 by Family Home Entertainment and is available on a DVD which comes with certain Pound Puppies toys.

References

External links 
 

1985 animated films
1980s American animated films
1985 television films
1985 films
American children's films
American television films
Films based on toys
Hanna-Barbera animated films
Hanna-Barbera television specials
Pound Puppies
Tonka films
Films directed by Ray Patterson (animator)
Films scored by Hoyt Curtin
1980s children's animated films
1980s English-language films